Saeid Rajabi Shirazi (born 10 March 1965) is an Iranian professional football coach and former football and futsal player.

Honours

Individual 

 Top Goalscorer: 
 FIFA Futsal World Cup: 1992 (17 goals)

References

1965 births
Living people
People from Karaj
Iranian footballers
Iranian men's futsal players
Association football forwards
Saipa F.C. players
21st-century Iranian people